Recinos is a Hispanic surname. 

The surname Recinos ranked 13,427 out of 88,799 in the United States.

Recinos may also refer to
 Adrián Recinos (1886–1962), Guatemalan essayist, historian and Mayanist scholar

References

Surnames